Margarita Behrens is a neuroscientist and biochemist. She is currently an associate professor at the Salk Institute for Biological Studies where her lab studies the impact of oxidative stress on the post-natal brain through probing the biology of fast-spiking parvalbumin interneurons in models of schizophrenia.

Early life and education 
Behrens completed her master's degree at the University of Chile in biochemistry and then continued to the Autonoma University in Madrid to conduct a PhD in molecular biology and biochemistry.  Behrens then completed her post-doctoral work at Washington University in St. Louis. In 2009, Behrens began working as a staff scientist as the Salk Institute where she led a group of researchers within Terry Sejnowski's computational neuroscience laboratory studying the circuitry implicated in schizophrenia in rodent models.

Career and research 
In 2018, the Salk Institute appointed Behrens as Research Professor, where she remains the first and only faculty member to hold this title. Her lab currently explores how environmental influences shape prefrontal cortical circuit development as a means to understand why some individuals might progress towards psychiatric illness while others do not. In an effort to dissect prefrontal cortical neurons in development, Behrens' lab uncovers novel subtypes of neurons through probing their unique DNA methylation patterns. Using single-nucleus sequencing technologies, Behrens has helped produce a novel dataset mapping the methylomes of both rodent and human prefrontal cortical neurons. This work has increased our knowledge of the diversity of cell types which provides an important platform for other neuroscientists to ask deeper questions about neural development in both health and disease. Behrens is now using the methylome dataset to ask translational question about how maternal environment may impact methylation in certain subtypes of neurons and how this may give rise to disease.

Selected Publications

Selected awards 

 2019 NIH Brain Initiative Award
 2019 Chan Zuckerberg Initiative to Expand Human Cell Atlas
 FEBS predoctoral Fellowship
 Cold Spring Harbor Laboratory Fellowship
 EMBO fellowship
 NARSAD Young Investigator Award
 Daniel X. Freedman Award

References

Living people
Date of birth missing (living people)
Chilean biochemists
Year of birth missing (living people)
University of Chile alumni
Autonomous University of Madrid alumni
Salk Institute for Biological Studies people
Women neuroscientists